Chloe, Love Is Calling You is a 1934 American pre-Code drama film directed by Marshall Neilan. The film is also known as Chloe (American short title). This was lead actress Olive Borden's last film.

Plot summary
A low-budget Southern drama about a light skinned woman who was raised in the swamps who wishes to avenge her black father's lynching. She falls in love with Wade Carson, a white man who works for Col. Gordon, who orchestrated the lynching. Later she discovers that Col. Gordon is actually her father.

Cast
Olive Borden as Chloe (Betty Ann Gordon)
Reed Howes as Wade Carson
Molly O'Day as Joyce, the Colonel's niece
Philip Ober as Jim Strong
Georgette Harvey as Old Mandy
Francis Joyner as Col. Gordon
J. Augustus Smith as Mose, a Thieving Worker
Jess Cavin as Hill, a Thieving Worker
Richard Huey as Ben, the Servant

Reception
Like many American films of the time, Chloe, Love Is Calling You was subject to review by city and state film censorship boards. The Ohio board banned the film.

Soundtrack
 "Chloe" (Music by Neil Moret, lyrics by Gus Kahn)

References

External links

1934 films
American horror films
1930s English-language films
American black-and-white films
1934 horror films
Films directed by Marshall Neilan
Censored films
1930s American films